The Red Head (French: Poil de carotte) is a 1952 French drama film directed by Paul Mesnier and starring Raymond Souplex, Germaine Dermoz and Pierre Larquey. It is based on the novel Poil de carotte by Jules Renard which had previously adapted into films twice by Julien Duvivier before the Second World War.

Cast
 Raymond Souplex as M. Lepic  
 Germaine Dermoz as Mme Lepic  
 Pierre Larquey as Le parrain 
 Odette Barencey as Honorine  
 Maurice Biraud 
 Jean-Jacques Duverger as Marceau  
 Guy Haurey as Félix  
 René Hell as L'adjoint  
 Corinne Jean-Jacques as Ernestine  
 Robert Le Fort as Paul  
 Lucienne Le Marchand as Agathe 
 Jean-Pierre Lituac as Le surveillant  
 Laure Paillette 
 Germaine Reuver as Mme Serain 
 Christian Simon as Poil de carotte  
 Marcel Vallée as Le directeur

References

External links 
 

1952 films
French drama films
1952 drama films
1950s French-language films
Films directed by Paul Mesnier
French black-and-white films
1950s French films